The Big Run Quarry Site is an archaeological site on the National Register of Historic Places near Luray, Virginia.  It is located in Shenandoah National Park.

References

Quarries in the United States
Archaeological sites on the National Register of Historic Places in Virginia
National Register of Historic Places in Rockingham County, Virginia
National Register of Historic Places in Shenandoah National Park